Sam Garrison (born November 13, 1976) is an American politician who has served in the Florida House of Representatives from the 18th district since 2020. He currently serves as the incumbent for Florida's 11th House of Representatives district and is a likely representative to be voted Florida's House Speaker for 2026.

References

External links

  at Florida House of Representatives
 Sam Garrison profile at Vote Smart

Living people
Republican Party members of the Florida House of Representatives
21st-century American politicians
1976 births